Robert Godwin is a writer.

Robert Godwin may also refer to:
Robert Godwin (Roundhead) (c. 1601–1681), English Commonwealth politician
Bob Godwin (1911–1980), an American boxer
Shooting of Robert Godwin

See also
Robert Goodwin (disambiguation)